This is a list of notable, or with at least 100 appearances, footballers who have played for São Paulo FC.

Players 

Appearance and goal totals include matches in all competitions and friendly matches.

Bold – Currently playing for São Paulo¤ – Started the career at São Paulo

Credits to Almanaque do São Paulo (by Placar and Alexandre Costa)

External links
 Official website
 Official website
 São Paulo Idols

São Paulo
 
Association football player non-biographical articles